Mali i Thatë (Suva Gora) is a mountain in southeast Albania; with a part of it being in the southwest of North Macedonia (known with the name Galičica and declared a National Park) with the highest altitude of 2287 meters.

Geography 
It borders Lake Prespa in the east, Lake Ohrid in northwest and overlooks the city of Pogradec to the west. It stretches 25 km from north to south and is 8 km wide in its central part. It is found within Albania, close to the Macedonian border. From this high peak, among several mountains of Albania, both Ohrid Lake and Prespa Lake can be seen as well as the third highest peak in North Macedonia, Baba Mountain or Pelister Mountain (2601 m). 
The mountain has an anticlinal shape and is almost completely composed of mesozoic limestone formations. Mali i Thatë has craggy slopes (especially the western face), whereas its crest is almost flat but full of karstic cavities. 

The vegetation is primarily made up of alpine meadows, whereas in the eastern face beech, oak and bush forests are found. 
Near the Albanian village of Goricë the soil is rich of iron bauxite and chalk minerals.  During the Albanian Revolt of 1911 Spiro Bellkameni's band defeated an Ottoman contingent in Mali i Thatë.

See also
 Prespa National Park (Albania)
 List of mountains in Albania

References

Mountains of Albania
Prespa National Park (Albania)